Screamfest Horror Film Festival is a horror film festival founded by film producers Rachel Belofsky and Ross Martin in August 2001. It runs over ten days during the month of October and is hosted at the TCL Chinese 6 Theatres in Los Angeles, California. In 2015, the festival celebrated its fifteenth anniversary and has been credited as being the largest and longest running horror film festival in the United States. The 2016 Screamfest was from October 18 through the 27.

Screamfest premieres and showcases new work from American and international independent horror filmmakers. Films that have premiered at the festival include Paranormal Activity, the series' final installment, Paranormal Activity: The Ghost Dimension, 30 Days Of Night, Let The Right One In, The Grudge, and The Human Centipede.

Screamfest has received praise from AMC as being an "audience-friendly fest that celebrates indie and foreign horror and is run for the fans more than the industry". The festival was also featured in a 2012 episode of Cupcake Wars, where the winning team would create cupcakes for the festival's closing VIP event.

Skull Awards 
The Screamfest Skull Award is awarded at the festival in several categories, which can include the following:
 Best Feature
 Directing
 Cinematography
 Editing
 Special Effects
 Musical Score
 Best Animation
 Best Short
 Best Documentary
 Best Student Film
 Trailblazer Award
 Future Icon Award
Career achievement awards are also occasionally awarded at the festival.

Convention history

References

External links
 

Film festivals in Los Angeles
Fantasy and horror film festivals in the United States